William Carrier (born December 20, 1994) is a Canadian professional ice hockey forward for the Vegas Golden Knights of the National Hockey League (NHL). Carrier was selected by the St. Louis Blues in the 2nd round (57th pick overall) of the 2013 NHL Entry Draft.

Early life
Carrier was born in LaSalle, Quebec, but grew up in Pierrefonds, Quebec.  His older brother also played hockey in the Quebec Junior Hockey League.

Playing career

Youth
As a youth, Carrier played in the 2007 Quebec International Pee-Wee Hockey Tournament with a minor ice hockey team from Deux-Rives. During the 2009–10 season, Carrier played in  three games for the midget AAA team Lac Saint-Louis Lions.

Major junior
Carrier was selected in the fourth round, 61st overall at the 2010 Quebec Major Junior Hockey League (QMJHL) draft by the Cape Breton Screaming Eagles. He recorded his first QMJHL goal on September 10, 2010, in a 3–2 win over the Halifax Mooseheads. Carrier was later selected to compete with Team Canada Quebec at the 2011 World U-17 Hockey Challenge, where he recorded five points in six games.

Leading up to the 2013 NHL Entry Draft, Carrier was lauded as a top-30 prospect. During a game against the Baie-Comeau Drakkar, Hockey Canada’s head scout Kevin Prendergast attended to view Carrier's play. Passed over in the first round, he was selected by the St. Louis Blues in the second round, 57th overall. On August 19, 2013, Carrier was signed to a three-year entry-level contract with the Blues.

In the 2013–14 season, on January 7, 2014, the Eagles traded Carrier along with Matthew Donnelly to the Drummondville Voltigeurs in exchange for Guillaume Gauthier, a first round pick in 2015, and a fifth round pick in 2014. Over a month later, Carrier was involved in a second trade as on February 28, 2014, the Blues traded his NHL contract, along with Chris Stewart, Jaroslav Halák, and 1st and 3rd round draft picks for the 2014 NHL Entry Draft to the Buffalo Sabres in exchange for netminder Ryan Miller and captain Steve Ott.

Professional
Carrier made his NHL debut on November 5, 2016, against the Ottawa Senators and recorded his first NHL goal against the Pittsburgh Penguins on November 19. During a game against the Boston Bruins in December 2016, Carrier was penalized for an illegal check to the head on David Backes, who suffered a concussion.

Having been left exposed by the Sabres for the 2017 NHL Expansion Draft, Carrier was selected by the Vegas Golden Knights on June 21, 2017. Carrier and the Golden Knights qualified for the 2018 Stanley Cup playoffs in their inaugural season. During the first round of the playoffs against the Los Angeles Kings, Carrier entered into concussion protocol as a result of an illegal check to the head by Drew Doughty. Carrier would be sat out another game during the Knights' third round against the Winnipeg Jets.

On February 27, 2020, Carrier signed a four-year, $5.6 million contract extension with the Golden Knights.

International play
Carrier was a member of the Bronze Medal winning Team Canada at 2012 IIHF World U18 Championships.

Personal life
Carrier and his wife Caroline Vezina had their first child together in March 2020. After the birth of his daughter, he was told to stay home as a result of COVID-19 suspending play.

Career statistics

Regular season and playoffs

International

Awards and honours

References

External links
 

1994 births
Living people
Buffalo Sabres players
Canadian ice hockey left wingers
Cape Breton Screaming Eagles players
Drummondville Voltigeurs players
Ice hockey people from Montreal
People from LaSalle, Quebec
People from Pierrefonds-Roxboro
Rochester Americans players
St. Louis Blues draft picks
Vegas Golden Knights players